The Honourable Mr Justice Jeremy Poon Shiu-chor is the Chief Judge of the High Court of Hong Kong and President of the Court of Appeal of Hong Kong.

Since 2018, he has served as President of the Scout Council of the Scout Association of Hong Kong.

Biography

Early life

Poon was born in Hong Kong in 1962. He received an LLB in 1985 and a PCLL in 1986 from the University of Hong Kong. He earned an LLM from University College London in the United Kingdom in the following year.

Legal and judicial career

Poon was called to the Hong Kong Bar in 1986 and was a barrister in private practice between 1988 and 1993.

In 1993, Poon joined the bench as a Permanent Magistrate. He sat as a Presiding Officer in the Labour Tribunal. Poon was appointed as Deputy Registrar of the High Court in 1999 and as Judge of Court of First Instance of the High Court in 2006. From 2011 to 2015, he was the Civil Listing Judge and the Judge in charge of the Probate List,  the Family Law List and the Mental Health List.

In 2012, Poon acted as Returning Officer for the 2012 Hong Kong Chief Executive election.

In 2015, Poon was elevated to the Court of Appeal.

On 22 May 2019, acting on the recommendation of the independent Judicial Officers Recommendation Commission (JORC), the Chief Executive announced Poon's appointment as Chief Judge of the High Court (a post which had become vacant upon the appointment of Andrew Cheung as a Permanent Judge of the Court of Final Appeal in October 2018), subject to the endorsement of the Legislative Council in accordance with Article 90 of the Basic Law. Pending the Legislative Council's endorsement, Poon was appointed as Acting Chief Judge of the High Court on 1 August 2019. After the Legislative Council endorsed Poon's appointment, Poon became Chief Judge of the High Court with effect from 18 December 2019.

In January 2021, Poon was appointed as a member of JORC.

Small house policy 

In January 2021, Poon ruled that all three methods of building land under the Small House Policy were completely legal, overturning an earlier decision in 2019. Poon told the plaintiffs, Hendrick Lui Chi-hang and Kwok Cheuk-kin, that they did not have sufficient standing to bring up the case because they do not own land rights in the New Territories. In response, a member of the Liber Research Community said that "The ding right affects every Hong Kong citizen as it competes with other land uses for land resources. The government has had to reserve lots of space in new towns for villagers to build their homes, while the land could have been better used for higher-density developments. How can the court say we have no stake in the issue?"

National security law 
In October 2022, Poon said that if there are any contradictions between the Basic Law and Hong Kong national security law, the national security law should take priority.

Jimmy Lai 
In October 2022, Poon was part of a team of 3 judges who ruled against Jimmy Lai and said that "despite its importance to the freedom of the press, the protection afforded to journalistic material is not absolute."

References

Living people
Barristers of Hong Kong
Hong Kong judges
Alumni of the University of Hong Kong
Alumni of University College London
1962 births

zh:潘兆初